Gehri Chaal is a 1973 Indian Hindi-language action-thriller film, produced and directed by C. V. Sridhar under the Chithrakala Pictures banner. It stars Jeetendra, Hema Malini, Amitabh Bachchan and music composed by Laxmikant–Pyarelal. The director remade the movie in Tamil in 1975 as Vaira Nenjam.

Plot 
Dharamchand is the Chairman of Olympic Bank, which is due for a final audit by the 30th of the month. Shortly thereafter, his daughter, Hema, finds his dead body in his bedroom. She immediately phones her brother, Ratan, who arrives, and finds a suicide note in his father's room, clarifying that he had embezzled 20 lakhs from the bank, is unable to repay it, and hence is killing himself. Ratan decides to protect the good name of the family and does not tell anyone about the suicide note to anyone, including Hema. Shortly thereafter, Ratan is approached by a blackmailer named Shekhar, who threatens to expose Ratan's secret if Ratan does not participate in a bank robbery that will take place two days before the final audit. Ratan assists him, the robbery takes place, the money is looted, all bank records are burnt, and the robbers make a successful getaway. Ratan is relieved that this problem has been resolved and the family name is not tarnished. The only problem is that Hema saw the robbers in action, and can identify one of them, a woman named Shobha. When she tells Ratan, he asks her to keep this information a secret. Then Ratan's friend, Sagar, arrives from Delhi for a visit, and it is here that Ratan finds out that Sagar is in a profession that has made him a suspect with the police, and may rip open the secret that Ratan has been trying to hide from the world. Soon it is revealed that Sagar is a CBI officer & he has been sent to find out the evidence for the Olympic Bank robbery. After inquiry, Sagar finds out that the main suspect is Madan, who is Ratan's best friend. Now, Ratan & Sagar meet Shobha & pressure her to tell everything about Madan. By the way, Madan shoots her before she says anything about him. Before dying, Shobha confesses that Dharamchand didn't commit suicide, but was murdered by Madan, who had embezzled 20 lakhs from the bank through Dharamchand & didn't want to repay the loan.

Cast 
Jeetendra as Sagar
Hema Malini as Hema
Amitabh Bachchan as Ratan
Bindu as Shobha
Prem Chopra as Madan
P. Jairaj as Dharamchand
Chandrashekhar as Shekhar

Soundtrack 
All songs were written by Rajendra Krishan.

References

External links 
 

1973 films
1970s Hindi-language films
1970s action thriller films
Films directed by C. V. Sridhar
Films scored by Laxmikant–Pyarelal
Films with screenplays by C. V. Sridhar
Indian action thriller films
Hindi films remade in other languages